Ocellularia gueidaniana is a species of corticolous (bark-dwelling) lichen in the family Graphidaceae. Found in Singapore, it was formally described as a new species in 2015 by Gothamie Weerakoon and Robert Lücking. The type specimen was collected by the first author at a low elevation in the Bukit Timah Nature Reserve. It is only known to occur at the type locality. The species epithet honours lichenologist Cécile Gueidan.

See also
List of Ocellularia species

References

gueidaniana
Lichen species
Lichens described in 2015
Lichens of Malesia
Taxa named by Gothamie Weerakoon
Taxa named by Robert Lücking